Something Is Killing the Children is an ongoing comic book series created by James Tynion IV and Werther Dell'Edera, published monthly by Boom! Studios beginning in September 2019.

Publication history
Something Is Killing the Children was announced as a five-issue limited series by BOOM! Studios in June 2019. In August 2019, ahead of the release of its first issue, it was announced that the series had been promoted to ongoing due to "overwhelming early support from retailers and fans". In June 2020, Something Is Killing the Children was nominated for Best New Series at the 2020 Eisner Awards, Tynion's first nomination.

Plot summary
Series synopsis from BOOM! Studios:
"When the children of Archer's Peak begin to go missing, everything seems hopeless. Most children never return, but the ones that do have terrible stories—impossible stories of terrifying creatures that live in the shadows. Their only hope of finding and eliminating the threat is the arrival of a mysterious stranger, one who believes the children and claims to see what they can see. Her name is Erica Slaughter. She kills monsters. That is all she does, and she bears the cost because it MUST be done."

Adaptations 
Supergirl Star Melissa Benoist will be playing Erica Slaughter In the Untiled Netflix show coming early 2024.

Spin-off series

House of Slaughter is an original series set in the world of Something is Killing the Children, exploring the secret history of the Order that forged Erica Slaughter into a monster hunter.

Awards and nominations

Reception and sales

Collected editions

Adaptation 
In 2021, a TV series adaptation was announced to be in development for Netflix with the same name. In February 2023 it was announced that Dark and 1899 creators Baran bo Odar and Jantje Friese had been hired to develop the adaptation after Mike Flanagan had departed due to creative differences.

Notes

References

Boom! Studios titles
Mystery comics
Horror comics
2019 comics debuts
Dystopian comics
Works about missing people